Bois des Îles is a fragrance produced by Parisian couturier Gabrielle "Coco" Chanel. The name is French for "Island Wood" or, more literally, "Wood of the Islands".

History
Coco Chanel had worked with Ernest Beaux on her original perfume, Chanel No. 5, which debuted in 1921. In 1926, they released Bois des Îles. According to the Chanel website, the fragrance of Bois des Iles was "the first woody fragrance for women".

The fragrance has notes of sandalwood, vetiver, tonka bean, vanilla, ylang ylang, iris, coriander, rose, jasmine, and aldehydes.

References

Chanel perfumes
Perfumes
History of cosmetics
Products introduced in 1927